Dieter Wunderlich (born 1937) is a German linguist currently and an Elected Fellow of the American Association for the Advancement of Science.

References

Fellows of the American Association for the Advancement of Science
Linguists from Germany
1937 births
Living people